The Medal Brotherhood in Arms of the National People’s Army was a medal issued in the German Democratic Republic (GDR).

Day of establishment: 17 February 1966.

Classes 
The medal was granted in three classes:
  – Bronze
  – Silver
  – Gold

Award criteria 
The medal could be presented for strengthening of the co-operation and brotherhood in arms to the armed forces of the Warsaw Pact. It was presented to:

 Soldiers and civil employees of the National People’s Army (Army, Navy or Air Force/Air Defense Force)
 Members of the Stasi
 Members of the armed forces of other Warsaw Pact countries
 Individuals of friendly socialist countries

It was presented to:

The award was presented in the name of the Minister of National Defense or Minister of State Security usually on the March 1, or October 7.

Document / Cash award: Each medal was accompanied by a document/certificate and a specific cash award.

Medal description 

The ribbon bar is 24 mm (just under 1 inch) wide, rectangular and corresponds with the medal ribbon.

The medal was awarded with a certificate and was worn on the left upper chest. Uniform regulations specify when the medal or ribbon bar was worn. Wear of this medal on the ribbon bar was mandatory.

The reverse of the medal, used from 1966 until 1990, features a ring around the State Seal in the GDR flag.

See also
Awards and decorations of East Germany
National People's Army

References 
 Taschenlexikon Orden und Medaillen Staatliche Auszeichnungen der DDR, VEB Bibliographisches Institute, Leipzig, 1983
 Standberg, John E., Auszeichnungen der Nationalen Volksarmee Part II, Die Nationale Volksarmee Issue No 11, Spring 1996
 Pickard, Ralph, Stasi Decorations and Memorabilia; A Collector's Guide, Frontline Historical Publishing, Lorton, VA, 2007

Orders, decorations, and medals of East Germany
Awards established in 1966
Awards disestablished in 1990
1966 establishments in East Germany
1990 disestablishments in Germany